Lewis Henry Meyers (a.k.a. "Crazy Horse") (December 9, 1859 – November 30, 1920) was a 19th-century baseball catcher and outfielder for the Cincinnati Outlaw Reds of the Union Association in 1884, playing in 2 career games on April 17 and May 10. He had three at-bats and did not record a hit. After his brief Major League career, Meyers spent two seasons in the Western League in 1886–1887 and finished his professional career with Charleston of the Southern Association in 1888.

External links

1859 births
1920 suicides
Major League Baseball catchers
Major League Baseball outfielders
Cincinnati Outlaw Reds players
Leadville Blues players
Denver Mountain Lions players
Denver Mountaineers players
Charleston Seagulls players
19th-century baseball players
Baseball players from Ohio
Suicides in Ohio
Suicides by poison